Potok pri Muljavi is a small settlement just southwest of Muljava in the Municipality of Ivančna Gorica in central Slovenia. The area is part of the historical region of Lower Carniola. The municipality is now included in the Central Slovenia Statistical Region.

Name
The name of the settlement was changed from Potok to Potok pri Muljavi in 1953.

Cultural heritage
A small roadside chapel in the southern part of the settlement is dedicated to Saint Anthony of Padua. It was built in the early 20th century.

References

External links
Potok pri Muljavi on Geopedia

Populated places in the Municipality of Ivančna Gorica